Ebenezer Hamlin (1844 – 4 June 1900) was a member of parliament in New Zealand, and an independent conservative.

Early life and family
Hamlin was born in Orua on the Manukau Harbour to the Rev James Hamlin, a missionary who had arrived in New Zealand in 1823 with the Church Missionary Society. He was the ninth and youngest son of the reverend. He fought in the New Zealand Wars in the 1860s, and was a Major in the Territorial Army. On 28 April 1868, Hamlin married Sarah Grace Barriball, the daughter of Charles Barriball of Waiuku, at her father's house near Waiuku (Barriball Road in Waiuku commemorates the location of the family's land).

Political career

Electors from Waiuku presented a requisition to Hamlin in November 1869 to stand for election in the Raglan electorate for the Auckland Provincial Council, which he accepted. Three representatives were elected on 20 December, and of four candidates, Joseph May came first and Hamlin came second. Hamlin remained a member of the provincial council until the abolition of provincial government in 1875.

He represented the South Auckland seats of Franklin in the New Zealand House of Representatives from 1876 to 1881; and then the replacement electorate of Franklin South from 1881 to 1890. He then represented the reconstituted Franklin electorate from 1890 to 1893 when he retired. He was never defeated.

He served as Chairman of Committees from 1882 to 1890.

Death
Hamlin died at his residence in the Auckland suburb of Remuera on 4 June 1900, and he was buried in the St Mark's Church cemetery, Remuera. He was survived by his wife, three sons, and seven daughters.

Notes

References

1844 births
1900 deaths
Members of the New Zealand House of Representatives
New Zealand MPs for North Island electorates
People of the New Zealand Wars
New Zealand Army officers
Members of the Auckland Provincial Council
19th-century New Zealand politicians